Luciano Zardi (born 15 September 1930) is an Italian weightlifter. He competed in the men's middle heavyweight event at the 1952 Summer Olympics.

References

External links
 
 
 

1930 births
Possibly living people
Italian male weightlifters
Olympic weightlifters of Italy
Weightlifters at the 1952 Summer Olympics
Sportspeople from Ferrara